|}

The Grand Prix de Paris is a Group 1 flat horse race in France open to three-year-old thoroughbred colts and fillies. It is run at Longchamp over a distance of 2,400 metres (about 1½ miles), and it is scheduled to take place each year in July.

History
The event was created by the Société d'Encouragement, a former governing body of horse racing in France. It originally served as a showpiece for the best home-bred three-year-olds to compete against international opponents over 3,000 metres. It was established in 1863, and the inaugural running was won by a British colt called The Ranger. The initial prize of 100,000 francs was raised by the Duc de Morny, who obtained half of the money from the Paris Municipal Council and an equal share of the remainder from each of the five main regional railway companies. For a period it was France's richest and most prestigious race.

The Grand Prix de Paris was abandoned because of the Franco-Prussian War in 1871. It was cancelled throughout World War I, with no running from 1915 to 1918. It continued to be the country's leading flat race until the introduction of the Prix de l'Arc de Triomphe in 1920. The event was temporarily switched to Le Tremblay in 1943 and 1944. It was extended to 3,100 metres in 1964.

The present system of race grading was introduced in 1971, and the Grand Prix de Paris was classed at the highest level, Group 1. It reverted to 3,000 metres in 1978, and it was shortened to 2,000 metres in 1987. It was sponsored by Louis Vuitton from 1988 to 1992, and the sponsorship of Juddmonte Farms began in 2001.

The distance of the Grand Prix de Paris was increased to 2,400 metres in 2005. It is normally held at an evening meeting on July 14, the French national holiday of Bastille Day.  Due to the COVID-19 pandemic, the 2020 running was postponed to 13 September, replacing the Prix Niel, traditionally run at that time.

Records
Leading jockey (6 wins):
 Tom Lane – Stuart (1888), Fitz Roya (1890), Clamart (1891), Rueil (1892), Ragotsky (1893), Perth (1899)

Leading trainer (13 wins):
 André Fabre – Dancehall (1989), Subotica (1991), Homme de Loi (1992), Fort Wood (1993), Grape Tree Road (1996), Peintre Celebre (1997), Limpid (1998), Slickly (1999), Rail Link (2006), Cavalryman (2009), Meandre (2011), Flintshire (2013), Gallante (2014)

Leading owner (7 wins):
 Edmond Blanc – Nubienne (1879), Clamart (1891), Rueil (1892), Andree (1895), Arreau (1896), Quo Vadis (1903), Ajax (1904)
 Aga Khan IV - Charlottesville (1960), Sumayr (1985), Valanour (1995), Khalkevi (2002), Montmartre (2008), Behkabad (2010), Shakeel (2017)

Winners since 1957

 The 2016 and 2017 races took place at Saint-Cloud while Longchamp was closed for redevelopment.

 The 2016 winner Mont Ormel was later exported to Hong Kong and renamed Helene Charisma.

 The 2020 race was run in September owing to the COVID-19 pandemic.

Earlier winners

 1863: The Ranger
 1864: Vermouth
 1865: Gladiateur
 1866: Ceylon
 1867: Fervacques *
 1868: The Earl
 1869: Glaneur
 1870: Sornette
 1871: no race
 1872: Cremorne
 1873: Boiard
 1874: Trent
 1875: Salvator
 1876: Kisber
 1877: Saint Christophe
 1878: Thurio
 1879: Nubienne
 1880: Robert the Devil
 1881: Foxhall
 1882: Bruce
 1883: Frontin
 1884: Little Duck
 1885: Paradox
 1886: Minting
 1887: Tenebreuse
 1888: Stuart
 1889: Vasistas
 1890: Fitz Roya
 1891: Clamart
 1892: Rueil
 1893: Ragotsky
 1894: Dolma Baghtche
 1895: Andree
 1896: Arreau
 1897: Doge
 1898: Le Roi Soleil
 1899: Perth
 1900: Semendria
 1901: Cheri
 1902: Kizil Kourgan
 1903: Quo Vadis
 1904: Ajax
 1905: Finasseur
 1906: Spearmint
 1907: Sans Souci
 1908: Northeast
 1909: Verdun
 1910: Nuage
 1911: As d'Atout
 1912: Houli
 1913: Bruleur
 1914: Sardanapale
 1915–16: no race
 1917: Brumelli
 1918: Montmartin
 1919: Galloper Light
 1920: Comrade
 1921: Lemonora
 1922: Kefalin
 1923: Filibert de Savoie
 1924: Transvaal
 1925: Reine Lumiere
 1926: Take My Tip
 1927: Fiterari
 1928: Cri de Guerre
 1929: Hotweed
 1930: Commanderie
 1931: Barneveldt
 1932: Strip the Willow
 1933: Cappiello
 1934: Admiral Drake
 1935: Crudité
 1936: Mieuxce
 1937: Clairvoyant
 1938: Nearco
 1939: Pharis
 1940: Maurepas
 1941: Le Pacha
 1942: Magister
 1943: Pensbury
 1944: Deux Pour Cent
 1945: Caracalla
 1946: Souverain
 1947: Avenger
 1948: My Love
 1949: Bagheera
 1950: Vieux Manoir
 1951: Sicambre
 1952: Orfeo
 1953: Northern Light
 1954: Popof
 1955: Phil Drake
 1956: Vattel
</div>
* The 1867 race finished as a dead-heat between Fervacques and Patricien, but it was decided by a run-off.

See also
 List of French flat horse races

References

 France Galop / Racing Post:
 galop.courses-france.com:
 1863–1889, 1890–1919, 1920–1949, 1950–1979, 1980–present

 france-galop.com – A Brief History: Grand Prix de Paris.
 galopp-sieger.de – Grand Prix de Paris.
 horseracingintfed.com – International Federation of Horseracing Authorities – Grand Prix de Paris (2017).
 pedigreequery.com – Grand Prix de Paris – Longchamp.
 tbheritage.com – Grand Prix de Paris.

Flat horse races for three-year-olds
Longchamp Racecourse
Horse races in France
Recurring sporting events established in 1863
1863 establishments in France

fr:Grand Prix de Paris (hippisme)